Richard Neil Haythornthwaite, known as Rick, (born December 1956) is a British business executive. He has led several companies including being the Chairman of MasterCard and the Creative Industries Federation. He has been appointed as the independent non-executive chairman of Ocado Group, stepping in by the time of the company's May 2021 annual general meeting to replace previous Ocado Chairman Stuart Rose.

Early life
Richard Neil Haythornthwaite was born in December 1956. He graduated from The Queen's College, Oxford, where he received a bachelor of science degree in geology. He earned a master's degree from the MIT Sloan School of Management as a Sloan Fellow.

Career
Haythornthwaite was an executive for BP from 1978 to 1995. He served as General Manager of the Magnus oilfield, operated by BP Exploration, and later served as the President of BP Venezuela.

Haythornthwaite served as the Chief Executive for Europe and Asia and Group Chief Executive of Blue Circle Industries from 1997 to 2001, preparing it for its sale to Lafarge for GBP£3.1 billion in cash. He served as the Chief Executive Officer of Invensys from 2001 to 2005. He was a partner of Star Capital Partners from 2006 to 2008. He also served as the Chairman of Network Rail.

Haythornthwaite became the Chairman of MasterCard in May 2006 and Chairman of the Creative Industries Federation in 2017. He stepped down from the Chairman position at Mastercard after 14 years, with effect from January 2021, to assume the role of independent non-executive chairman for Ocado Group, after Ocado’s AGM in May 2021.

Haythornthwaite served on the Boards of Directors of the Imperial Chemical Industries, Lafarge, Premier Oil and Land Securities. On 6 March 2018 he joined the global independent investment bank, Moelis & Company, as an Advisory Partner in the U.K.  He was Chairman of Centrica from January 2014 to February 2019.

Philanthropy
Haythornthwaite served as the Chairman of the Board of Governors of the Southbank Centre for seven years, standing down in January 2015. He also served as member of the board of the World Wide Web Foundation. He is a Fellow of the Royal Society of Arts.  In April 2022 it was announced that the UK Prime Minister had approved the appointment of Haythornthwaite to chair an independent review of the terms and conditions of service of the UK Armed Forces.

References

1956 births
Living people
Alumni of The Queen's College, Oxford
British chief executives in the energy industry
MIT Sloan Fellows
MIT Sloan School of Management alumni
British business executives
British corporate directors
BP people
Centrica people